Lalitha is a raga in Carnatic music (musical scale of South Indian classical music). It is a janya raga of Mayamalavagowla, the 15th Melakarta raga. It is closely related to Vasantha, as the two share many characteristic prayogas and have similar scales. Lalitha is often used In Tamil film songs, especially by Ilayaraja who has composed five film songs based on this ragam.

Structure 
Lalitha is an asymmetric scale that does not contain panchamam. It is called a shadava raga structure is as follows (see swaras in Carnatic music for details on below notation and terms):

ārohaṇa : 
avarohaṇa : 

This scale uses the notes shadjam, shuddha rishabham, antara gandharam, shuddha madhyamam, shuddha dhaivatham and kakali nishadam.

Popular compositions 
Lalitha has ample scope for alapana. This scale has been used by many composers for compositions in classical music. Here are some popular compositions in Lalitha.

Hiranmayim Lakshmim and Agastiswaram by Muthuswami Dikshitar. Dikshitar also uses it in the ragamalika Sri Vishwanatham Bhaje.
Nannu brovu Lalitha by Syama Sastri
Seetamma Mayamma by Thyagaraja (popularly sung in Vasantha, though R Vedavalli and others sing it in Lalitha). 
Natanala Brahmayaku by Annamacharya
Sri Rajarajeshwareem by Jayachamarajendra Wadiyar

Film Songs

Language:Tamil

Notes

References

Janya ragas